Penicillium levitum is an anamorph species of the genus of Penicillium.

References

Further reading 
 
 
 
 

levitum
Fungi described in 1948